This is a list of heads of state of Germany.

History 
Germany was ruled by monarchs from the beginning of division of the Frankish Empire in August 843 to the dissolution of the Holy Roman Empire in August 1806. During most of 19th century, independent German principalities were organized into various confederations, such as the Confederation of the Rhine dominated by Napoleon (1806-1913) and the German Confederation created by the Congress of Vienna (1814-1866). The Prussian-led  North German Confederation (1866-1871) subsequently morphed into a modern nation state, the German Reich, which was ruled by emperors from 1871 to the collapse of all German monarchies in 1918.

The President of Germany replaced the monarch in 1919. Chancellor Adolf Hitler assumed the duties of head of state as Führer and Chancellor from 1934 until his suicide in April 1945. In 1949, Germany was divided into two states. The Federal President, head of state of West Germany, became head of state for all of Germany following German reunification in 1990.

East Frankish kingdom, 843–962

Carolingians

Conradine dynasty

Ottonian dynasty

Holy Roman Empire, 962–1806
The title "King of the Romans", used under the Holy Roman Empire, is (from this point onwards) considered equivalent to King of Germany. A king was chosen by the German electors and would then proceed to Rome to be crowned emperor by the pope.

Ottonian dynasty (continued)

Salian dynasty

Supplinburger dynasty

Hohenstaufen and Welf dynasties

Interregnum

Changing dynasties

Habsburg

Wittelsbach

Habsburg-Lorraine

Confederation of the Rhine, 1806–1813

German Confederation, 1815–1866

North German Confederation, 1867–1871

German Reich, 1871–1945

German Emperor, 1871-1918

President, 1919–1945
† denotes people who died in office.

Federal Republic of Germany, from 1949
† denotes people who died in office.

German Democratic Republic (East Germany), 1949–1990
† denotes people who died in office.

|-align="center"
! colspan=7| President of the Republic

|-align="center"
! colspan=7| Chairman of the State Council

|-align="center"
! colspan=7| President of the People's Chamber

Styles of the Heads of State
Unified state (1871 to 1945)

East and West Germany (1949 to 1990)

Unified state (1990 to present)

Notes

References

 
Emperors of Germany
Germany
Kings
 
Germany